Ressen is a part of the village with the same name, that was incorporated into the city of Nijmegen in the province of Gelderland, the Netherlands. It is now a Quarter of this city.

Populated places in Gelderland
Nijmegen